Ĝ or ĝ (G circumflex) is a consonant in Esperanto orthography, representing a voiced postalveolar affricate (either palato-alveolar or retroflex), and is equivalent to a voiced postalveolar affricate  or a voiced retroflex affricate .

While Esperanto orthography uses a diacritic for its four postalveolar consonants, as do the Latin-based Slavic alphabets, the base letters are Romano-Germanic. Ĝ is based on the letter g, which has this sound in English and Italian before the vowels i and e (with some exceptions in English), to better preserve the shape of borrowings from those languages (such as ĝenerala from general) than Slavic đ (Serbo-Croatian) or dž would.

Uses of Ĝ in other languages 
In Haida, a language isolate, the letter ĝ was sometimes used to represent pharyngeal voiced fricative .

In Aleut,  an Eskaleut language, ĝ represents a voiced uvular fricative .  The corresponding voiceless Aleut sound is represented by x̂.

In Dutch, the letter ĝ is used in some phrase books and dictionaries for pronunciation help. It represents a plosive , because g is pronounced as a fricative  in Dutch.

In some transcriptions of Sumerian, ĝ is used to represent the velar nasal .

id:Sirkumfleks#Ĝĝ

Character mappings

See also
 Ĉ
 Ĥ
 Ĵ
 Ŝ
 Ŭ

Aleut language
Esperanto letters with diacritics
Latin letters with diacritics